Daniel Alexander Wishart (born 28 May 1992) is an English professional footballer who currently plays as a defender for Hampton & Richmond Borough.

Club career
Wishart started his footballing career at local side Hayes & Yeading United, where he played over 100 times, before joining Alfreton Town in 2013. Failing to establish himself as a key player at Alfreton, Wishart had loan spells at Margate and Eastleigh before returning to Hayes & Yeading United for the 2014–15 season. After impressing within his first few games of the campaign, Wishart moved to fellow Conference South side Sutton United. On 15 November 2014, Wishart made his Sutton debut during their 2–1 home defeat against Hemel Hempstead Town, featuring for 63 minutes before being replaced by Jessy Reindorf. A couple of months later, Wishart scored his first goal for Sutton during their 1–1 draw with Wealdstone, with the opening goal in the 42nd minute. Wishart quickly became a regular in the Sutton starting lineup, having an influential role in their promotion to the National League during the 2015–16 season.

Following an impressive start to the 2016–17 season, Wishart joined Forest Green Rovers in October 2016. Wishart made his Forest Green debut in their 4–0 away victory over Aldershot Town, featuring for the entire 90 minutes. He scored his first goal for Forest Green in an EFL Trophy tie against Newport County on 29 August 2017.

On 18 June 2018, Wishart returned to Sutton United on a two-year contract for an undisclosed fee, before signing for Maidstone United in November 2018. Following Maidstone's relegation, Wishart was transfer listed by the club after citing a desire to play at a higher level. However, he was swiftly reintroduced to the team in 2019-20, scoring 8 times in total before the season was curtailed due to the COVID-19 pandemic.

On 3 July 2020, Wishart returned to the National League by signing for Wealdstone. Wishart made his first appearance for the club on 27 October 2020, coming off the bench against King's Lynn in a 3–2 victory for the Stones, with his first start coming on 9 January 2021 against Hartlepool United. At the end of the season, it was announced that Wishart would be departing the club. However, he continued to train with the club, and was later included in the squad for the 2021–22 season. On 20 October 2021, Wishart signed for Hemel Hempstead Town on loan. He played a total of 24 games for Hemel, scoring once. On 17 May 2022, it was announced that Wishart had been released by Wealdstone. Wishart returned for a third permanent spell at Hayes & Yeading United in the summer of 2022 before departing for Hampton & Richmond Borough in November 2022.

Career statistics

Honours
Sutton United
 National League South: 2015–16

Forest Green Rovers
 National League play-offs: 2017

References

External links

1992 births
Living people
Footballers from Hillingdon
English footballers
Association football defenders
Hayes & Yeading United F.C. players
Hendon F.C. players
Burnham F.C. players
Alfreton Town F.C. players
Margate F.C. players
Eastleigh F.C. players
Sutton United F.C. players
Forest Green Rovers F.C. players
Maidstone United F.C. players
Wealdstone F.C. players
Hemel Hempstead Town F.C. players
Hampton & Richmond Borough F.C. players
National League (English football) players
Isthmian League players
Southern Football League players
English Football League players
England semi-pro international footballers